"Three Time Loser" is a song written and recorded by American country music artist Dan Seals.  It was released in May 1987 as the third single from the album On the Front Line.  It was his sixth straight number-one single on the Billboard country charts.

Charts

Weekly charts

Year-end charts

References

1987 singles
1986 songs
Dan Seals songs
Songs written by Dan Seals
Song recordings produced by Kyle Lehning
EMI Records singles